Dendrobium glabrum, commonly known as the creeping star orchid, is a species of epiphytic orchid native to New Guinea and Australia. It has shiny pseudobulbs with a single leathery leaf and white, star-shaped flowers with yellow tips. It forms large clumps on trees in humid forests.

Description
Flowering occurs sporadically and the flowers only last a few hours.

Taxonomy and naming
Dendrobium glabrum was first formally described in 1907 by Johannes Jacobus Smith and the description was published in Bulletin du Département de l'Agriculture aux Indes Néerlandaises. The specific epithet (glabrum) is a Latin word meaning "smooth".

Distribution and habitat
The creeping star orchid grows on trees in humid forest in New Guinea and on the Cape York Peninsula as far south as Cairns.

References 

glabrum
Orchids of New Guinea
Orchids of Queensland
Plants described in 1907